Bethel African Methodist Episcopal Church is a historic African American congregation and building in Iowa City, Iowa, United States. The congregation was established in 1868 mostly by free people of color from the south and the rest from the north. James W. Howard, a member of the congregation, bought property in a recent addition to the city and sold the southern half to the church for $50. This white frame church was built on the property the same year. Iowa City has always had a small African American community and over the years the congregation grew and declined in numbers and in finances. The congregation outgrew the small church and a new  sanctuary was built in 2010 that holds three times the current congregation's size.

References

Religious organizations established in 1868
Churches completed in 1868
African Methodist Episcopal churches in Iowa
National Register of Historic Places in Iowa City, Iowa
Churches on the National Register of Historic Places in Iowa
Churches in Iowa City, Iowa
African-American history of Iowa